The 2022–23 Coupe de France preliminary rounds, Hauts-de-France is the qualifying competition to decide which teams from the leagues of the Hauts-de-France region of France take part in the main competition from the seventh round.

A total of twenty teams will qualify from the Hauts-de-France preliminary rounds.

In 2021–22, three teams progressed as far as the round of 64. AS Beauvais Oise beat FC Chambly from the division above, before losing to ES Thaon from the division below on penalties. Entente Feignies Aulnoye FC were beaten by Paris Saint-Germain. Wasquehal Football were heavily beaten by Vannes OC.

Draws and fixtures
Draws for the first two rounds were carried out separately by districts. First round draws were published in July and early August, with a total of 828 clubs featuring. Draws for the second round were in some cases published at the same time as the first round, and in some cases after the conclusion of the first round. A total of 291 ties were drawn, with 168 teams entering at this stage. Only 287 ties were scheduled due to penalties from the first round and subsequent withdrawals.

The third round draw, which saw the entry of the five remainining teams from Régional 1 and the ten from Championnat National 3, was published on the leagues Facebook page on 6 September 2022. The fourth round draw, which saw the entry of the five Championnat National 2 teams from the region, was also published on the leagues Facebook page on 15 September 2022.

The fifth round draw, including the only club in the region from Championnat National, was published on 29 September 2022. The sixth round draw was published on 10 October 2022.

First round
These matches were played on 27 and 28 August 2022, with one replayed on 4 September 2022.

Second round
These matches were played on 3, 4 and 11 September 2022.

Third round
These matches were played on 10, 11 and 18 September 2022.

Fourth round
These matches were played on 24 and 25 September 2022.

Fifth round
These matches were played on 8 and 9 October 2022.

Sixth round
These matches were played on 15 and 16 October 2022.

References

Preliminary rounds